August Friedrich Schweigger (8 September 1783 – 28 June 1821) was a German naturalist born in Erlangen. He was the younger brother of scientist Johann Salomo Christoph Schweigger (1779-1857).

He studied medicine, zoology and botany at Erlangen, and following graduation spent time in Berlin (from 1804) and Paris (from 1806). In 1809 he was appointed professor of botany and medicine at the University of Königsberg. In 1815, he was elected a corresponding member of the Royal Swedish Academy of Sciences. On a research trip to Sicily, he was murdered near Agrigento on 28 June 1821.

The plant genus Schweiggeria from the family Violaceae is named in his honor.

In the scientific field of herpetology, he is best known for his 1812 monograph of turtles, in which he described several new species which are still valid.

Turtle taxa described by Schweigger
Schweigger is the taxonomic authority of Chelydra, a genus of snapping turtles. 

In 1812 he described as new species the following 12 species of turtles and tortoises.
Adanson's mud turtle, Pelusios adansonii 
Aldabra giant tortoise, Geochelone gigantea 
South American river turtle, Podocnemis expansa 
Big-headed Amazon River turtle, Peltocephalus dumerilianus
Common toad-headed turtle, Mesoclemmys nasuta 
Serrated hinge-back tortoise, Kinixys erosa 
Geoffroy's side-necked turtle, Phrynops geoffroanus 
Gibba turtle, Mesoclemmys gibba 
Indian black turtle, Melanochelys trijuga 
South African bowsprit tortoise, Chersina angulata 
Mediterranean turtle, Mauremys leprosa
West African mud turtle, Pelusios castaneus

Selected publications 
 Specimen flora erlangensis, 1805. 
 Kranken- und Armenanstalten in Paris (Medical and charitable institutions in Paris), Bayreuth: Lübeck, 1809.
 Prodromus Monographia Cheloniorum auctore Schweigger. Königsberg. Arch. Naturwiss. Mathem. 1: 271-368, 406-458, 1812.
 Einige Worte über Classification der Thiere, (Treatise on the classification of animals), 1812.
 Prodromi monographiae cheloniorum, 1814. 
 Beobachtungen auf naturhistorischen Reisen (Observations on natural history trips). Berlin, 1819.
 Handbuch der Naturgeschichte der skelettlosen ungegliederten Tiere (Textbook of natural history on unsegmented invertebrates). Leipzig, 1820.
 De plantarum classificatione naturalis, 1821.
 "The Life and Herpetological Contributions of August Friedrich Schweigger" (Published in English); Society for the Study of Amphibians and Reptiles, 2008.

References 
 August Friedrich Schweigger @ Allgemeine Deutsche Biographie
 Parts of this article are based on a translation of the equivalent article from the German Wikipedia.

19th-century German botanists
German naturalists
German herpetologists
People from Erlangen
Academic staff of the University of Königsberg
Members of the Royal Swedish Academy of Sciences
1783 births
1821 deaths